Hinode Peak is a small coastal peak,  high, located  southwest of Cape Hinode on the coast of Queen Maud Land, Antarctica. It was mapped from surveys and air photos by the Japanese Antarctic Research Expedition, 1957–62, and named Hinode-yama (sunrise mountain).

References

Mountains of Queen Maud Land
Prince Olav Coast